Odontoglossum praestans is a species of orchid native to western South America.

praestans